The Kuwajima Formation is an Early Cretaceous geologic formation in Japan. Its precise age is uncertain due to a lack of identifying fossils, and it was previously considered likely Valanginian to Hauterivian in age. However, it is now considered to probably be Barremian in age. Dinosaurs and other vertebrates has been recovered from the Kaseki-kabe "Fossil-bluff" locality in the uppermost part of the formation.

The multituberculate mammals Hakusanobaatar matsuoi and Tedoribaatar reini are known from the Kuwajima Formation. A member of Tritylodontidae, Montirictus kuwajimaensis, has also been recovered from the unit.

Vertebrate Paleobiota

Fish

Amphibians

Choristoderes

Squamates

Dinosaurs

Mammaliamorphs

Invertebrate Paleobiota

See also

 List of dinosaur-bearing rock formations

References

Geologic formations of Japan
Lower Cretaceous Series of Asia
Cretaceous Japan

Barremian Stage